Galerius Valerius Maximianus (258 – May 311) was Roman emperor from 305 to 311. During his reign he campaigned, aided by Diocletian, against the Sasanian Empire, sacking their capital Ctesiphon in 299. He also campaigned across the Danube against the Carpi, defeating them in 297 and 300. Although he was a staunch opponent of Christianity, Galerius ended the Diocletianic Persecution when he issued an Edict of Toleration in Serdica in 311.

Early life
Galerius was born near Serdica, in Dacia Ripensis, later named Dacia Mediterranea, though some modern scholars consider the strategic site where he later built his palace named after his mother – Felix Romuliana (Gamzigrad) – his birth and funeral place. His father was a Thracian and his mother Romula had left Roman Dacia because of the Carpians' attacks. He originally followed his father's occupation, that of a herdsman, where he was nicknamed "Armentarius", herdsman. His original cognomen was "Maximinus", but he changed it to "Maximianus" after becoming Caesar.

He served with distinction as a soldier under Emperors Aurelian and Probus, and in 293, at the establishment of the Tetrarchy, was designated Caesar along with Constantius Chlorus, receiving in marriage Diocletian's daughter Valeria (later known as Galeria Valeria), and at the same time being entrusted with the care of the Illyrian provinces. After a few years campaigning against Sarmatians and Goths on the Danube, he received command of the legions on the eastern imperial limits. Soon after his appointment, Galerius was dispatched to Egypt to fight the rebellious cities Busiris and Coptos.

War with Persia

Invasion, counterinvasion
In 294, Narseh, a son of Shapur I, who had been passed over for the Sassanid succession, came into power in Persia. Narseh probably moved to eliminate Bahram III, a young man installed by a noble named Vahunam in the wake of Bahram II's death in 293.  In early 294, Narseh sent Diocletian the customary package of gifts, but within Persia, he was destroying every trace of his immediate predecessors, erasing their names from public monuments. He sought to identify himself with the warlike reigns of Ardashir (r. 226–241) and Shapur (r. 241–272), who had sacked Roman Antioch and captured Emperor Valerian.

In 295 or 296, Narseh declared war on Rome. He appears to have first invaded western Armenia, retaking the lands delivered to Tiridates in the peace of 287. He occupied the lands there until the following year.  The historian Ammianus Marcellinus, circa 320–395, is the only source detailing the initial invasion of Armenia. Southern (1999, 149) dates the invasion to 295; Barnes (1982, 17, 293) mentions an earlier, unsuccessful invasion by Narseh based on the fact that the title Persici Maximi was given to all four emperors; Odahl (2004, 59) concurs with Barnes and suggests that Saracen princes in the Syrian desert collaborated with Narseh's invasion.  Narseh then moved south into Roman Mesopotamia, where he inflicted a severe defeat on Galerius, then commander of the eastern forces, in the region between Carrhae (Harran, Turkey) and Callinicum (Raqqa, Syria).  Diocletian may or may not have been present at the battle, but  presented himself soon afterwards at Antioch, where the official version of events was made clear: Galerius was to take all the blame for the affair.  In Antioch, Diocletian forced Galerius to walk a mile in advance of his imperial cart while still clad in the purple robes of an emperor.  The message conveyed was clear; the loss at Carrhae was not due to the failings of the empire's soldiers, but due to the failings of their commander, and Galerius' failures would not be accepted. Galerius' position at the head of the caravan possibly was merely the conventional organization of an imperial progression, designed to show a Caesar's deference to his Augustus.

Galerius's army was reinforced probably in the spring of 298 by new contingents collected from the empire's Danubian holdings. Narseh did not advance from Armenia and Mesopotamia leaving Galerius to lead the offensive in 298 with an attack on northern Mesopotamia via Armenia. Diocletian may or may not have been present to assist the campaign. Narseh retreated to Armenia to fight Galerius' force, to Narseh's disadvantage; the rugged Armenian terrain was favorable to Roman infantry, but not to Sassanid cavalry. Local aid gave Galerius the advantage of surprise over the Persian forces, and, in two successive battles, Galerius secured victories over Narseh.

During the second encounter, the Battle of Satala in 298, Roman forces seized Narseh's camp, his treasury, his harem, and his wife.  Narseh's wife would live out the remainder of the war in Daphne, a suburb of Antioch, serving as a constant reminder to the Persians of the Roman victory. Galerius advanced into Media and Adiabene, winning continuous victories, most prominently near Theodosiopolis (Erzurum), and securing Nisibis (Nusaybin) before 1 October  298. He moved down the Tigris, taking Ctesiphon, and gazing onwards to the ruins of Babylon before returning to Roman territory via the Euphrates. No source ever specifically claims that Ctesiphon was sacked, but it is assumed to have been, primarily due to the seizure of Narseh's wife and harem.

Peace negotiations
Narseh had previously sent an ambassador to Galerius to plead for the return of his wife and children, but Galerius had dismissed this ambassador, reminding him of how Shapur had treated Valerian. The Romans, in any case, treated Narseh's captured family well perhaps seeking to evoke comparisons to Alexander and his beneficent conduct towards the family of Darius III. Peace negotiations began in the spring of 299, with both Diocletian and Galerius presiding. Their magister memoriae (secretary) Sicorius Probus was sent to Narseh to present terms.

The conditions of the Peace of Nisibis were heavy: Persia would give up territory to Rome, making the Tigris the boundary between the two empires.  Further terms specified that Armenia was returned to Roman domination with the fort of Ziatha as its border; Caucasian Iberia would pay allegiance to Rome under a Roman appointee; Nisibis, now under Roman rule, would become the sole conduit for trade between Persia and Rome; and Rome would exercise control over the five satrapies between the Tigris and Armenia: Ingilene, Sophanene (Sophene), Arzanene (Aghdznik), Corduene, and Zabdicene (near modern Hakkâri, Turkey). These regions included the passage of the Tigris through the Anti-Taurus range; the Bitlis pass, the quickest southerly route into Persian Armenia; and access to the Tur Abdin plateau. With these territories, Rome would have an advance station north of Ctesiphon, and would be able to slow any future advance of Persian forces through the region. Under the terms of the peace, Tiridates would regain both his throne and the entirety of his ancestral claim, and Rome would secure a wide zone of cultural influence in the region. Because the empire was able to sustain such constant warfare on so many fronts, it  has been taken as a sign of the essential efficacy of the Diocletianic system and the goodwill of the army towards the tetrarchic enterprise.

Rule as Augustus

After the abdication of Diocletian in 305 and the elevation of Constantius I and Galerius to the rank of Augustus, two new Caesars were required to take their place. The two persons whom Galerius promoted to the rank of Caesar were very much his creatures, and he hoped to enhance his authority throughout the empire with their elevation.

First was Maximinus Daza, whose mother was Galerius' sister. An inexperienced youth with little formal education, he was invested with the purple, exalted to the dignity of Caesar, and assigned the command of Egypt and Syria. Second was Severus, Galerius' comrade in arms; he was sent to Mediolanum to receive the possession of Italy and Africa. According to the forms of the constitution, Severus acknowledged the supremacy of the western emperor, but he was absolutely devoted to the commands of his benefactor Galerius, who, reserving to himself the intermediate countries from the confines of Italy to those of Syria, firmly established his power over three-quarters of the empire.

His hopes were dashed when his colleague Constantius died at York in 306 and the legions elevated his son Constantine to the position of Augustus. Galerius only discovered this when he received a letter from Constantine, who informed him of his father's death, modestly asserted his natural claim to the succession, and respectfully lamented that the enthusiastic violence of his troops had not allowed him to obtain the imperial purple in the regular and constitutional manner. The first emotions of Galerius were those of surprise, disappointment, and rage, and as he could seldom restrain his passions, he threatened to burn both the letter and the messenger.

Later, however, when he had time to reconsider his position, he inevitably saw that his chances of winning a war against Constantine were doubtful at best.  Galerius was well aware of Constantine's strengths – Constantine had been his guest for some time at Nicomedia – and knew that Constantius' legions were wildly devoted to his son.  Therefore, without either condemning or ratifying the choice of the Roman army, Galerius accepted the son of his deceased colleague as the ruler of the provinces beyond the Alps; but he gave him only the title of Caesar, and the fourth rank among the Roman princes, whilst he conferred the vacant place of Augustus on his favourite Severus.

The ambitious spirit of Galerius was only just over this disappointment when he beheld the unexpected loss of Italy to Maxentius, who was married to his daughter Valeria Maximilla. Galerius' need for additional revenue had persuaded him to make a very strict and rigorous examination of the property of his subjects for the purpose of a general taxation. A very minute survey was taken of their real estates and, wherever there was the slightest suspicion of concealment, torture was used to obtain a sincere declaration of their personal wealth. Italy had traditionally been exempt from any form of taxation, but Galerius ignored this precedent, and the officers of the revenue already began to number the Roman people, and to settle the proportion of the new taxes. Italy began to murmur against this indignity and Maxentius used this sentiment to declare himself emperor in Italy, to the fury of Galerius. Therefore, Galerius ordered his colleague Severus to immediately march to Rome, in the full confidence that, by his unexpected arrival, he would easily suppress the rebellion. Severus was captured after his troops deserted to their old commander Maximian, who had once again been elevated to the rank of co-emperor, this time by his son Maxentius. Severus was later executed.

The importance of the occasion needed the presence and abilities of Galerius. At the head of a powerful army collected from Illyricum and the East, he entered Italy, determined to avenge Severus and to punish the rebellious Romans.  But due to the skill of Maximian, Galerius found every place hostile, fortified, and inaccessible; and though he forced his way as far as Narni, within sixty miles of Rome, his control in Italy was confined to the narrow limits of his camp.

Seeing that he was facing ever-greater difficulties, Galerius made the first advances towards reconciliation, and dispatched two officers to tempt the Romans by the offer of a conference, and the declaration of his paternal regard for Maxentius, reminding them that they would obtain much more from his willing generosity than anything that might have been obtained through a military campaign.  The offers of Galerius were rejected with firmness, his friendship refused, and it was not long before he discovered that, unless he retreated, he would share Severus' fate. It was not a moment too soon; large monetary gifts from Maxentius to his soldiers had corrupted the fidelity of the Illyrian legions. When Galerius finally began his withdrawal from Italy, it was only with great difficulty that he managed to stop his veterans deserting him. In frustration, Galerius allowed his legions to ravage the countryside as they passed northwards. Maxentius declined to make a general engagement.

With so many emperors now in existence, in 308 Galerius, together with the retired emperor Diocletian and the now active Maximian, called an imperial 'conference' at Carnuntum on the River Danube to rectify the situation and bring some order back into the imperial government. Here it was agreed that Galerius' long-time friend and military companion Licinius, who had been entrusted by Galerius with the defense of the Danube while Galerius was in Italy, would become Augustus in the West, with Constantine as his Caesar. In the East, Galerius remained Augustus and Maximinus remained his Caesar. Maximian was to retire, and Maxentius was declared a usurper.

Galerius' plan soon failed. The news of Licinius' promotion was no sooner carried into the East, than Maximinus, who governed the provinces of Egypt and Syria, rejected his position as Caesar and, notwithstanding the prayers as well as arguments of Galerius, exacted the equal title of Augustus. Around the same time, Maximian proclaimed himself emperor in Arles in opposition to Constantine, who was campaigning against the Franks. For the first, and indeed for the last time, seven emperors administered the Roman world: Galerius (East), Maximinus II (East), Licinius (Middle), Constantine I (West), Maximian (West), Maxentius (Italy), and Domitius Alexander (Africa).

The last years of Galerius saw him relinquishing his aspirations towards being the supreme ruler of the empire, though he managed to retain the position of first among equals. He spent the remainder of his years enjoying himself and ordering some important public works, such as discharging into the Danube the superfluous waters of Lake Pelso (now Lake Balaton), and cutting down the immense forests that encompassed it.

Persecution of Christians

Christians had lived pleasantly during most of the rule of Diocletian. The persecutions that began with an edict of 24 February 303, were credited by Christians to Galerius' work, as he was a fierce advocate of the old ways and old gods.  Christian houses of assembly were destroyed, for fear of sedition in secret gatherings.

Diocletian was not anti-Christian during the first part of his reign, and historians have claimed that Galerius decided to prod him into persecuting them by secretly burning the Imperial Palace and blaming it on Christian saboteurs. Regardless of who was at fault for the fire, Diocletian's rage was aroused and he began one of the last and greatest Christian persecutions in the history of the Roman Empire.

It was at the insistence of Galerius that the last edicts of persecution against the Christians were published, beginning in 303, and this policy of repression was maintained by him until the appearance of the general edict of toleration, issued from Nicomedia in April 311, apparently during his last bout of illness (see Edict of Toleration by Galerius). Galerius's last request was that Christians should pray for him as he suffered with a painful and fatal illness.

Initially one of the leading figures in the persecutions, Galerius later admitted that the policy of trying to eradicate Christianity had failed, saying:  "wherefore, for this our indulgence, they ought to pray to their God for our safety, for that of the republic, and for their own, that the republic may continue uninjured on every side, and that they may be able to live securely in their homes."  Lactantius gives the text of the edict in his moralized chronicle of the bad ends to which all the persecutors came, De Mortibus Persecutorum. This marked the end of official persecution of Christians. Christianity was officially legalized in the Roman Empire two years later in 313 by Constantine and Licinius in the Edict of Milan.

Death
Galerius died in late April or early May 311 from a horribly gruesome disease described by Eusebius and Lactantius, possibly some form of bowel cancer, gangrene or Fournier gangrene.

Galerius was buried in his mausoleum at Gamzigrad-Romuliana, which was part of the palace he built at his birthplace, today's Zaječar in Serbia. Several lumps composed of corroded iron ring mail (lorica hamata) have been found at the site. This mail armour may have been worn by the wax figure of the emperor that was burned during the imperial funeral and apotheosis ceremony. The entire site has been inscribed into the World Heritage List in June 2007.

Anti-Roman accusations
According to Lactantius, a Christian and adviser to Constantine, Galerius affirmed his Dacian identity and avowed himself the enemy of the Roman name once made emperor, even proposing that the empire should be called, not the Roman, but the Dacian Empire, much to the horror of the patricians and senators. Lactantius further states that Galerius exhibited anti-Roman attitude as soon as he had attained the highest power, treating the Roman citizens with ruthless cruelty, like the conquerors treated the conquered, all in the name of the same treatment that the victorious Trajan had applied to the conquered Dacians, forefathers of Galerius, two centuries before.

Honours
Galerius Peak in Antarctica is named after Emperor Galerius.

Family tree

See also
 Arch and Tomb of Galerius
 Civil Wars of the Tetrarchy (306–324)

Notes

References

Sources

Ancient sources

Codex Theodosianus.
Mommsen, T. and Paul M. Meyer, eds. Theodosiani libri XVI cum Constitutionibus Sirmondianis et Leges novellae ad Theodosianum pertinentes2 (in Latin). Berlin: Weidmann, [1905] 1954. Compiled by Nicholas Palmer, revised by Tony Honoré for Oxford Text Archive, 1984. Prepared for online use by R.W.B. Salway, 1999. Preface, books 1–8. Online at University College London  and the University of Grenoble. Accessed 25 August 2009.
Unknown edition (in Latin). Online at AncientRome.ru. Accessed 15 August 2009.
Epitome de Caesaribus.
Banchich, Thomas M., trans. A Booklet About the Style of Life and the Manners of the Imperatores. Canisius College Translated Texts 1. Buffalo, NY: Canisius College, 2009. Online at De Imperatoribus Romanis. Accessed 15 August 2009.
Eusebius of Caesarea.
Historia Ecclesiastica (Church History).
McGiffert, Arthur Cushman, trans. Church History. From Nicene and Post-Nicene Fathers, Second Series, Vol. 1. Edited by Philip Schaff and Henry Wace. Buffalo, NY: Christian Literature Publishing Co., 1890. Revised and edited for New Advent by Kevin Knight. Online at New Advent. Accessed 25 August 2009.
Vita Constantini (Life of Constantine).
Richardson, Ernest Cushing, trans. Life of Constantine. From Nicene and Post-Nicene Fathers, Second Series, Vol. 1. Edited by Philip Schaff and Henry Wace. Buffalo, NY: Christian Literature Publishing Co., 1890. Revised and edited for New Advent by Kevin Knight. Online at New Advent. Accessed 25 August 2009.
Festus. Breviarium.
Banchich, Thomas M., and Jennifer A. Meka, trans. Breviarium of the Accomplishments of the Roman People. Canisius College Translated Texts 2. Buffalo, NY: Canisius College, 2001. Online at De Imperatoribus Romanis. Accessed 15 August 2009.
Lactantius. De Mortibus Persecutorum (On the Deaths of the Persecutors).
Fletcher, William, trans. Of the Manner in Which the Persecutors Died. From Nicene and Post-Nicene Fathers, Second Series, Vol. 7. Edited by Alexander Roberts, James Donaldson, and A. Cleveland Coxe. Buffalo, NY: Christian Literature Publishing Co., 1886. Revised and edited for New Advent by Kevin Knight. Online at New Advent. Accessed 25 August 2009.
XII Panegyrici Latini (Twelve Latin Panegyrics).
Nixon, C.E.V., and Barbara Saylor Rodgers, ed. and trans. In Praise of Later Roman Emperors: The Panegyrici Latini. Berkeley: University of California Press, 2015.
Zosimus. Historia Nova (New History).
Unknown, trans. The History of Count Zosimus. London: Green and Champlin, 1814. Online at Tertullian. Accessed 15 August 2009.{{efn|This edition and translation is not very good. The pagination is broken in several places, there are many typographical errors (including several replacements of "Julian" with "Jovian" and "Constantine" with "Constantius"). It is nonetheless the only translation of the Historia Nova in the public domain.

Modern sources

 Banchich, Thomas M. "Iulianus (c. 286–293 AD)." De Imperatoribus Romanis (1997). Accessed March 8, 2008.
 Barnes, Timothy D. "Lactantius and Constantine." The Journal of Roman Studies 63 (1973): 29–46.
 Barnes, Timothy D. Constantine and Eusebius. Cambridge, MA: Harvard University Press, 1981. 
 
 Bleckmann, Bruno. "Diocletianus." In Brill's New Pauly, Volume 4, edited by Hubert Cancik and Helmut Schneider, 429–438. Leiden: Brill, 2002. 
 Bowman, Alan K., Peter Garnsey, and Averil Cameron. The Cambridge Ancient History, Volume XII: The Crisis of Empire. Cambridge University Press, 2005. 
 Brown, Peter. The Rise of Western Christendom. Oxford: Blackwell Publishing, 2003. 
 Burgess, R.W. "The Date of the Persecution of Christians in the Army". Journal of Theological Studies 47:1 (1996): 157–158.
 Corcoran, Simon. The Empire of the Tetrarchs: Imperial Pronouncements and Government, AD 284–324. Oxford: Clarendon Press, 1996. 
 Corcoran, "Before Constantine", Simon. "Before Constantine." In The Cambridge Companion to the Age of Constantine, edited by Noel Lenski, 35–58. New York: Cambridge University Press, 2006. Hardcover  Paperback 
 DiMaio, Jr., Michael. "Constantius I Chlorus (305–306 AD)." De Imperatoribus Romanis (1996a). Accessed March 8, 2008.
 DiMaio, Jr., Michael. "Galerius (305–311 AD)." De Imperatoribus Romanis (1996b). Accessed March 8, 2008.
 DiMaio, Jr., Michael. "Maximianus Herculius (286–305 AD)." De Imperatoribus Romanis (1997). Accessed March 8, 2008.
 Elliott, T. G. The Christianity of Constantine the Great. Scranton, PA: University of Scranton Press, 1996. 
 Gibbon, Edward, 'Decline and Fall of the Roman Empire', Chapter 14
 Harries, Jill. Law and Empire in Late Antiquity. Cambridge: Cambridge University Press, 1999. Hardcover  Paperback 
 Helgeland, John. "Christians and the Roman Army A.D. 173–337." Church History 43:2 (1974): 149–163, 200.
 
 Jones, A.H.M. The Later Roman Empire, 284–602: A Social, Economic and Administrative Survey. Baltimore: Johns Hopkins University, 1986.
 
 Lenski, Noel. "The Reign of Constantine." In The Cambridge Companion to the Age of Constantine, edited by Noel Lenski, 59–90. New York: Cambridge University Press, 2006b. Hardcover  Paperback 
 Mackay, Christopher S. "Lactantius and the Succession to Diocletian." Classical Philology 94:2 (1999): 198–209.
 Mathisen, Ralph W. "Diocletian (284–305 AD.)." De Imperatoribus Romanis (1997). Accessed February 16, 2008.
 Odahl, Charles Matson. Constantine and the Christian Empire. New York: Routledge, 2004. Hardcover  Paperback 
 Pohlsander, Hans. The Emperor Constantine. London & New York: Routledge, 2004a. Hardcover  Paperback 
 Pohlsander, Hans. "Constantine I (306 – 337 AD)." De Imperatoribus Romanis (2004b). Accessed December 16, 2007.
 Potter, David S. The Roman Empire at Bay: AD 180–395. New York: Routledge, 2005. Hardcover  Paperback 
 
 Southern, Pat. The Roman Empire from Severus to Constantine. New York: Routledge, 2001. 
 Rostovtzeff, Michael. The Social and Economic History of the Roman Empire. Oxford: Oxford University Press, 1966. 
 Treadgold, Warren. A History of the Byzantine State and Society. Stanford: Stanford University Press, 1997. 
 Williams, Stephen. Diocletian and the Roman Recovery. New York: Routledge, 1997.

External links

 Medieval Sourcebook: Edict of Toleration by Galerius, 311.
 Gaius Galerius Valerius Maximianus
 Lactantius about Galerius in his "De Mortibus Persecutorum" chapter XXIII & XXVII
 Catholic Encyclopedia

 
250s births
311 deaths
3rd-century Roman consuls
3rd-century Roman emperors
4th-century Roman consuls
4th-century Roman emperors
Caesars (heirs apparent)
Deified Roman emperors
Galerii
People of the Roman–Sasanian Wars
Tetrarchy
Valerii
Roman emperors to suffer posthumous denigration or damnatio memoriae
Roman pharaohs
Illyrian emperors